Goblin Lake is a 1979 role-playing game adventure for Tunnels & Trolls published by Flying Buffalo.

Premise
Goblin Lake is the first of Flying Buffalo's "pocket adventurers" in which the player is a goblin.

Reception
Lorin Rivers reviewed Goblin Lake in The Space Gamer No. 28. Rivers commented that "I had absolutely no fun. This 'adventure' is brief and not very exciting. It's a bad start for the new format. I don't recommend it."

References

External links
 Goblin Lake at RPG Geek

Role-playing game supplements introduced in 1979
Tunnels & Trolls adventures